Mariusz Korzępa (17 January 1991 – 26 March 2016) was a Polish footballer who played as a midfielder.

Biography

Korzępa was born in the small town of Kolbuszowa in South East Poland. Korzępa started playing football in the youth levels of his local team, Kolbuszowianka Kolbuszowa and Orły Rzeszów before joining the biggest team in the area, Stal Mielec. After four seasons in the Stal youth teams Korzępa was moved to the first team, making his debut in 2008. After 26 league appearances in his first season in the first team, Korzępa joined Ekstraklasa team Lechia Gdańsk. Korzępa instantly joined the Lechia Gdańsk II team to develop, making his debut for the team in a 2–0 win against Czarni Czarne. The following season he made his most appearances for the Lechia II team, with 19 appearances and 4 goals. The following season Korzępa joined Siarka Tarnobrzeg on loan, before making a permanent transfer to Stal Mielec at the end of the season. While playing for Stal against Tomasovia Tomaszów Lubelski, Korzępa picked up an injury which kept him out for a season. Korzępa then joined Czarni Połaniec, scoring 4 goals in 10 appearances, before quickly returning to play for Stal Mielec for a third time. After only 4 appearances on his return Korzępa joined Siarka Tarnobrzeg for the second time spending 6 months with the team and making 13 appearances in the league. Korzępa joined his final team, Wolczanka Wolka Pelkinska, at the beginning of 2016. He made his only appearance for the team against Orzeł Przeworsk in a 1–1 draw.

On 26 March 2016 Wolczanka Wolka Pelkinska were travelling to play an away game against Avia Świdnik. Eight members of the squad were travelling together in a van, which ended up colliding with a truck. The accident instantly killed three players, Kamil Pydych, Rafał Pydych and Patryk Szewczak. Five other players were seriously injured including Korzępa. Mariusz Korzępa died in hospital 6 days after the accident. Korzępa was due to be married in the summer, and had a 4 month old child. In total the crash killed 5 members of the Wolczanka Wolka Pelkinska squad, and forcing another to retire from their injuries.

References

1991 births
Polish footballers
Stal Mielec players
Lechia Gdańsk players
Siarka Tarnobrzeg players
Association football midfielders
2016 deaths
Road incident deaths in Poland